Camp Run is a  long 1st order tributary to Buffalo Creek in Brooke County, West Virginia.

Variant names
According to the Geographic Names Information System, it has also been known historically as:
Wells Run

Course
Camp Run rises about 1 mile south of Independence, Pennsylvania, in Washington County and then flows southwesterly into Brooke County to join Buffalo Creek about 1 miles east of Bethany, West Virginia.

Watershed
Camp Run drains  of area, receives about 39.7 in/year of precipitation, has a wetness index of 324.80, and is about 51% forested.

See also
List of rivers of West Virginia

References

Rivers of Pennsylvania
Rivers of West Virginia
Rivers of Brooke County, West Virginia
Rivers of Washington County, Pennsylvania